Art Damage is the second album by the mathcore band Fear Before the March of Flames, released in 2004. "Should Have Stayed in the Shallows" is the only music video that Fear Before The March Of Flames made for the album.

Critical reception
Drowned in Sound described the album as "more screams, more stabbed-at guitars, more noise, more passion, more intelligence, more everything." Exclaim! wrote: "With dissonant riffs laid out over stellar technical drumming, the musical skill exhibited by FBTMOF makes Art Damage a truly interesting listen, as do the added sonic layers of noise and abstract sound."

Track listing

Personnel
Adam Fisher - guitar, vocals
David Marion - lead Vocals
Brandon Proff - drums
Mike Madruga - bass guitar

Produced, engineered and mixed by Matthew Ellard
Recorded at QDivision and Moontower Studios, April–May 2004 in Somerville, Massachusetts
Drum tech: Carl Plaster
Mastered by Alan Douches at West West Side
Management by Mike Kaminsky
Layout and design by Brandon Proff

References

Fear Before albums
2004 albums
Equal Vision Records albums